HRD may refer to:

Science and medicine

 Hertzsprung–Russell diagram, in astronomy
 Homologous recombination deficiency
 Hurricane Research Division, of the United States National Oceanic and Atmospheric Administration

Sport

 Home Run Derby, Major League Baseball
 Humboldt Roller Derby
 Houston Roller Derby
 Hurdles

Other uses

 Croatian dinar, a former currency of Croatia
 Handel Reference Database
 Harling Road railway station, in England
 Harlem River Drive, in New York City
 Hood River Distillers
 HRD Motorcycles, a British motorcycle manufacturer
 Human remains detection
 Human resource development
 Human rights defender